The Ecker is a , right-hand, southeast tributary of the Oker which runs mainly through the Harz mountains in the German states of Saxony-Anhalt and Lower Saxony.

Course 
From its source to Abbenrode the Ecker is a border river, today running between the federal states of Saxony-Anhalt and Lower Saxony. Prior to German reunification this was also the border between the German Democratic Republic in the east and Federal Republic of Germany to the west.

Until the border was reopened it was the end of the Goethe Way (Goetheweg) from Torfhaus. Today there is a large picnic area with toilets at the Eckersprung.

Along a steep, rocky bed, the Ecker initially flows to the Ecker Dam, then through the deeply incised Ecker valley towards the north-northeast, where it passes the Ahlsburg, and then leaves the Harz. The upper Ecker valley is part of the Harz National Park. Only the site of the paper factory, located there since the 19th century, was excluded.

See also 
List of rivers of Lower Saxony
List of rivers of Saxony-Anhalt

References 

Rivers of Lower Saxony
Rivers of Saxony-Anhalt
Rivers of the Harz
Rivers of Germany